Hungry Joe may refer to:

Hungry Joe, (c. 1850-March 22, 1902), an American criminal and swindler
Hungry Joe, Montana, an unincorporated community in Dawson County
Hungry Joe, a character in Joseph Heller's novel Catch-22, see List of Catch-22 characters